Reena Andrea Raggi (born May 11, 1951 in Jersey City, New Jersey) is a senior United States circuit judge of the United States Court of Appeals for the Second Circuit and maintains her chambers in Brooklyn, New York. She was formerly a United States district judge of the United States District Court for the Eastern District of New York.

Education and background

Raggi earned her Bachelor of Arts degree from Wellesley College in 1973, where she was elected to Phi Beta Kappa. She later earned her Juris Doctor from Harvard Law School, where she served as a member of the Board of Student Advisers, graduating cum laude in 1976. Following her graduation from law school in 1976, she served for a year as a law clerk for Judge Thomas E. Fairchild of the United States Court of Appeals for the Seventh Circuit.

She was admitted to the bar in New York, and joined the Manhattan law firm of Cahill Gordon & Reindel until her appointment as an Assistant United States Attorney for the Eastern District of New York in 1979, serving in that capacity until her appointment in 1986 as Interim U.S. Attorney. Later that year, she returned to private law practice at the New York law firm of Windels, Marx, Davies, and Ives.

Federal judicial service

District court service
President Ronald Reagan nominated Raggi to the Eastern District of New York on January 20, 1987 to a seat vacated by Judge Frank Altimari, who was elevated to the United States Court of Appeals for the Second Circuit on December 11, 1985. She was confirmed on May 7, 1987. She received her commission on the same day. She was the first woman to serve on the 14-member bench in the Eastern District of New York and, at 35 years old, one of the youngest federal judges in the nation. Raggi presided over the Golden Venture trial, in which a ship carrying around 300 would-be immigrants from China crash-landed on a sandbar off Queens, New York in June 1993. Her service as a district court judge was terminated on October 7, 2022 when she was elevated to the 2nd Circuit Court.

Court of appeals service
President George W. Bush nominated Raggi for the Second Circuit on May 1, 2002 to replace Judge Amalya Lyle Kearse, who assumed senior status on June 11, 2002. She was confirmed by the United States Senate on September 20, 2002 by a 85–0 vote. She received her commission on October 4, 2002. She assumed senior status on August 31, 2018.

Raggi is known for her aggressive questioning of lawyers from the bench.

References

External links

Background Info from USDOJ Office of Legal Policy 
N.Y. Times, June 24, 1986, "Raggi Suggested for U.S. Judgeship"

1951 births
20th-century American judges
21st-century American judges
American people of Italian descent
Assistant United States Attorneys
Harvard Law School alumni
Judges of the United States Court of Appeals for the Second Circuit
Judges of the United States District Court for the Eastern District of New York
Living people
People from Jersey City, New Jersey
Lawyers from New York City
United States Attorneys for the Eastern District of New York
United States court of appeals judges appointed by George W. Bush
United States district court judges appointed by Ronald Reagan
Wellesley College alumni
People associated with Cahill Gordon & Reindel
20th-century American women judges
21st-century American women judges